The 1970 Prague Skate was a senior international figure skating competition held 13–15 November 1970 in Czechoslovakia. Medals were awarded in the disciplines of men's singles and ladies' singles. West German national champion Klaus Grimmelt obtained gold in the men's event while the Soviet Union's Vladimir Kovalev, a future Olympic medalist, took the silver medal. Czechoslovakia's Ľudmila Bezáková won the ladies' title in a competition featuring skaters from a dozen countries.

Results

Men

Ladies

References

Prague Skate
Prague